David Juurlink (born New Glasgow, Nova Scotia) is a Canadian pharmacologist and internist. He is head of the Clinical Pharmacology and Toxicology division at Sunnybrook Health Sciences Centre in Toronto, Ontario, as well as a medical toxicologist at the Ontario Poison Centre and a scientist at the Institute for Clinical Evaluative Sciences. He is known for researching adverse effects caused by drug interactions, with some of this research funded by a New Investigator Award from the Canadian Institutes for Health Research. He has been very critical of his fellow physicians' regular prescribing of dangerous opioids like Tramadol and fentanyl. In June 2017, he published a letter analyzing citations to "Addiction Rare in Patients Treated with Narcotics", a 1980 letter in The New England Journal of Medicine that has often been cited to claim that opioids like OxyContin are rarely addictive.

References

External links
David Juurlink Profile

Canadian pharmacologists
Living people
People from New Glasgow, Nova Scotia
Canadian toxicologists
1968 births